Moshe Barazani, also Barzani (June 14, 1926 – April 21, 1947), was an Iraqi-born Kurdish Jew and a member of Lehi ("Freedom Fighters of Israel," aka the "Stern Gang") underground movement in pre-state Mandate Palestine during the Jewish insurgency in Palestine. He is most notable for having committed suicide with a hand grenade together with Meir Feinstein, another Jewish underground fighter under sentence of death, shortly before their scheduled executions, and is memorialized in Israel today as one of the Olei Hagardom.

Early life
Barazani was born in Baghdad to a Kurdish Jewish family from Barzan. The family moved to Jerusalem when he was six. At an early age, he began working, initially as a carpenter's apprentice, and then in a soft drinks factory.

Underground activity
Barazani joined Lehi at an early age, following in the footsteps of his brother. Initially, he was a member of Lehi's youth division and posted propaganda leaflets, but later joined the fighting force. He participated in numerous sabotage operations, laying mines to destroy British vehicles and taking part in railway sabotage.

On March 9, 1947, Barazani was sent on a mission to assassinate a senior British officer, Brigadier A.P. Davies, with a grenade. He was stopped and searched by a British patrol which found him near the Schneller Camp, a British installation in Jerusalem. A grenade was found in his pocket, and he was arrested. On March 17, 1947, he was tried before a military court on charges of illegal weapons possession and conspiracy to murder, convicted, and sentenced to death.

Suicide

While awaiting execution in the Central Prison in Jerusalem's Russian Compound, he met Irgun fighter Meir Feinstein, who had also been sentenced to death. On April 21, 1947, shortly before their scheduled executions, they committed suicide with an improvised grenade which had been smuggled inside a hollowed-out orange. The two embraced each other with the live grenade lodged between them. The story of Feinstein and Barazani became a celebrated tale in Zionism. Menachem Begin, leader of Irgun and later prime  minister of Israel, was buried next to them on the Mount of Olives in accordance with his will.
To commemorate the 60th anniversary of Barazani's death, a state ceremony was held at the Museum of the Underground Prisoners in Jerusalem in 2007.

References

External links
Moshe Barazani
The last words of Barazani and Feinstein

1926 births
1947 suicides
Kurdish Jews
Iraqi Kurdish people
Lehi (militant group)
People from Baghdad
Iraqi Jews
Olei Hagardom
People who committed suicide in prison custody
Prisoners who died in British military detention
Burials at the Jewish cemetery on the Mount of Olives
Iraqi emigrants to Mandatory Palestine
Prisoners sentenced to death by the British military
Suicides by explosive device
Deaths by hand grenade
Iraqi people who died in prison custody
Palestinian people who died in prison custody